A continent is a large landmass defined by continental shelves and the cultures in the continent. In the modern day, there are seven continents. However, there have been more continents throughout history. Vaalbara was the first continent. Europe is the newest continent. Geologists have predicted that certain continents will appear, these being Pangaea Proxima, Novopangaea, Aurica, and Amasia.

List of Continents

References 

age, list
Lists by date